
Year 431 BC was a year of the pre-Julian Roman calendar. At the time, to Romans  it was known as the Year of the Consulship of Cincinnatus and Mento (or, less frequently, year 323 Ab urbe condita). The denomination 431 BC for this year has been used since the early medieval period, when the Anno Domini calendar era became the prevalent method in Europe for naming years.

Events 
 By place 
 Greece 
 Athens enters into an alliance with King Sitalkes of Thrace, after Nymphodorus, an influential Athenian, marries Sitalkes' sister. Nymphodorus then negotiates an agreement between Athens and Macedon's King Perdiccas II, through which Perdiccas regains Therma. As a result, Athens withdraws its support for Perdiccas' brother, Philip, and the Thracians promise to assist Perdiccas in capturing him. In return, Perdiccas marches on the Chalcidians, the people he has originally persuaded to revolt.
 A Theban raid on Plataea, the only pro-Athenian city in Boeotia, is a failure and the Plataeans take 180 prisoners and put them to death. Athens supports Plataea while Sparta aligns itself with Thebes. Sparta enlists the help of the Greek cities in Italy and Sicily. Both Sparta and Athens appeal to Persia, but without result.
 The Spartans, led by King Archidamus II, invade Attica effectively starting the Second Peloponnesian War between the Athenian Empire and the Peloponnesian League. The Spartans lay waste to the countryside around Athens. Athenian leader, Pericles, does not seriously oppose them, rather withdrawing the rural population of the country districts within Athens' city walls. Instead, he pursues active naval warfare and reduces any danger from the island of Aegina by replacing its native population with Athenians.

 Roman Republic 
 The Romans defeat the Aequi and the Volsci at the battle of Mount Algidus.

 By topic 
 Science 
 The Greek philosopher Empedocles distinguishes the four elements - earth, fire, water, and air - that he claims all substances are made of. He explains the development of the universe by the forces of attraction and repulsion known as Love and Strife.

 Literature 
 Euripides' play Medea wins third prize at the Dionysia, the famous Athenian dramatic festival.

Births 
 Xenophon, Athenian Greek mercenary and writer (d. c. 354 BC)

Deaths 

 Phidias returns to Athens, where he is imprisoned (for having been portrayed on the shield of the statue of the goddess Athena) and dies before the trial.

References